Lygaeus alboornatus is a species of seed bug in the family Lygaeidae, found mainly in South America.

References

External links

 

Lygaeidae
Insects described in 1852